Petar Godev (born June 7, 1969) is a Bulgarian sprint canoer who competed from the late 1980s to the early 1990s. He won a bronze medal in the K-4 500 m event at the 1989 ICF Canoe Sprint World Championships in Plovdiv.

Godev also competed in two Summer Olympics, earning his best finish of eighth in the K-4 1000 m event at Barcelona in 1992.

References

Sports-reference.com profile

1969 births
Bulgarian male canoeists
Canoeists at the 1988 Summer Olympics
Canoeists at the 1992 Summer Olympics
Living people
Olympic canoeists of Bulgaria
ICF Canoe Sprint World Championships medalists in kayak
20th-century Bulgarian people